Abakelia, is a Georgian surname. Notable people with the surname include:

Ioseb Abakelia (1882–1938), Georgian physician and medical scholar
Tamar Abakelia (1905–1953), Georgian sculptor, theater designer, and illustrator

Georgian-language surnames